Kaushal Kumar Verma (born 7 March 1971) is an Indian mathematician who specializes in complex analysis. He earned a B.Tech degree in engineering physics,from IIT Bombay in 1992. He then obtained a PhD. in mathematics from Indiana University, Bloomington, and also worked at Syracuse University for an year, followed by working at the University of Michigan, Ann Arbor, for 3 years.  He was awarded the Shanti Swarup Bhatnagar Prize in 2014. He is a professor in the department of mathematics and dean of mathematical and physical sciences at Indian Institute of Science, Bangalore.

References

External links 
 Kaushal Kumar Verma's Home Page

1971 births
Living people
20th-century Indian mathematicians
Academic staff of the Indian Institute of Science
Recipients of the Shanti Swarup Bhatnagar Award in Mathematical Science